Sergio Rossetti Morosini (born 1953) is a Brazilian-American Scholar, artist and author of Venetian extraction who served as Brazil's Cultural attaché in New Orleans and is dedicated to preserving the Atlantic Forest and restoring the art in stone of New York City Landmarks.

Early life 
Sergio Rossetti Morosini is the middle of five children born to parents Italia Morosini and Pedro Rossetti, descendants of two old Venetian families, Morosini and Rossetti, that settled in the Atlantic Forest in Southern Brazil. Sergio grew up in the city of Guarapuava, in the heart of the state of Paraná's Araucaria Forest.

Education 
Sergio is educated in economics, diplomacy, and holds master's degrees in Fine Arts and History of Art from the Pratt Institute, Brooklyn, NY, where he later taught a Contemporary Sculpture and 3D illustration Course.

Career and marriage 
In his early 20s he represented Brazil in United States as a cultural attaché at the Consulate General in New Orleans, Louisiana. There, while he was enrolled in the graduate program of Tulane University's Department of Social Sciences, he met the artist, Adèle, then, a fine arts student at Tulane's Newcomb College. They were married in 1976; he was 22 and she was 21.

International affairs 
Sergio's tenure at the consulate, however, coincided with the end of the Brazilian Miracle. Through numerous cultural events, and partnerships with Loyola and Tulane Universities, and later with the newly founded New Orleans Area Latin American Chamber of Commerce, he worked diligently with New Orleans Mayor Moon Landrieu's administration, the International Relations Office, the International Trade Mart, and the Board of Commissioners of the Port of New Orleans to unite the Latin American businesses behind a comprehensive trade policy through the ports of New Orleans and Gulfport-Biloxi, Mississippi. Sergio was conferred the title of "Honorary State Senator" by the Lieutenant Governor, James Edward "Jimmy" Fitzmorris, Jr., Coordinator of International Relations and President of the Louisiana State Senate.

Cultural institutes 
He is a founding member of the Brazilian-American Cultural Institute of New Orleans (BACI). and The Brazilian-American Chamber of Commerce of New Orleans.

The Vatican 
Sergio has been invited twice to the Vatican to view from the scaffolding, the restoration of the frescoes Michelangelo painted on the Sistine, the private Chapel of the Pope. First, in early Fall 1987, as a guest of the Agnelli family and the curator of the Vatican Museums, Fabrizio Mancinelli, during the Restoration and controversy of the ceiling, and later, in the Summer of 1992, to view the restoration of The Last Judgment with Dr. Diana Gisolfi of the Pratt Institute, as guests of Marilyn Perry, president of the Kress Foundation and the Head Restorer for Papal Monuments, Museums and Galleries, Gianluigi Colalucci.

Art historical contribution 
First to observe that in 1511, Titian described the volume in a two-dimensional fresco painting of Saint Anthony's Miracle of the Jealous Husband, in the Scuola del Santo, Padua, Italy, by actually sculpting it in relief rather than describing it illusionistically.

Works in stone 
He is devoted to the conservation of the Art in the New York City Landmarks. Among his works are the Charles Millard Pratt House, 241 Clinton Ave, Brooklyn's Clinton Hill Historic District, now the home of the Roman Catholic Bishop of Brooklyn, the Brockholst building at 101 W 85th Street, and Columbus Avenue, NY, NY 10024, and his Bust of Michelangelo Buonarroti above the door of the National Arts Club, 15 Gramercy Park South in the borough of Manhattan in New York City, both a New York City Landmark and a National Historic Landmark.

Environmental work 
Sergio is currently shooting a documentary on the endangered ecosystems of the Atlantic Forest of Brazil, Paraguay, and Argentina. In Spring 2007, he moved his Studios from Brooklyn to Poughkeepsie, in the Hudson River Valley, NY.

Gallery

References

External links

Categories 

1953 births
20th-century Italian sculptors
20th-century male artists
Italian male sculptors
21st-century Italian sculptors
21st-century male artists
American environmentalists
American naturalists
Artist authors
Artists from New York City
Brazilian environmentalists
Brazilian naturalists
21st-century Brazilian artists
21st-century Brazilian male artists
Brazilian painters
Brazilian sculptors
Climate activists
Ethnographers
Sergio Rossetti
20th-century Italian painters
Italian male painters
21st-century Italian painters
Living people
Pratt Institute faculty
Dutchess
People from Dutchess County, New York
People from Guarapuava
People from Paraná (state)
Writers from Poughkeepsie, New York
Pratt Institute alumni
Tulane University alumni
Painters from Venice
Cultural attachés
Brazilian American
American people of Brazilian descent